Elis or Ilia (Ileia) is a historic region in the western part of the Peloponnese peninsula of Greece. It is administered as a regional unit of the modern region of Western Greece. Its capital is Pyrgos. Until 2011 it was Elis Prefecture, covering the same territory.

The modern regional unit is nearly coterminous with the ancient Elis of the classical period. Here lie the ancient ruins of cities of Elis, Epitalion and Olympia, known for the ancient Olympic Games which started in 776 BC.

Geography

The modern regional unit is not completely congruent with ancient Elis: Lampeia belonged to ancient Arcadia, and Kalogria is now part of Achaea.

The longest river is the Alfeios. Other rivers are the Erymanthos, Pineios and Neda. Alfeios, Pineios and Neda flow into the Ionian Sea in Elis. Less than 1% of the prefecture is open water, most of it found in artificial reservoirs and dams, in the north and east. The Pineios Dam supplies water for Northern Elis. The water is not safe for drinking, because it contains some contaminants. A second, smaller reservoir in the river Alfeios near Olympia and Krestena supplies water to Pyrgos.

The eastern part of the regional unit is forested, with mostly pine trees in the south. There are forest preserves in Foloi and the mountain ranges of Eastern Elis. In the north is the Strofylia forest which has pine trees. Mountain ranges include Movri (around 720 m or 2,400 ft), Divri (around 1500 m), Minthe (around 1100 m), and more.

About one-third of the land is fertile; the rest is mountainous and not suitable for crops. Swamplands used to cover 1–1.5% of the region, especially in the Samiko area. Most of them have been drained for agricultural purposes; only 10 km² (4 sq miles) has been kept and is now protected.

Here lie the ancient ruins of Elis, Epitalion and Olympia, known for the ancient Olympic Games which started in 776 BC. There is a museum with statues that relate to the history of Olympia. Another museum is in Elis, but it is very small. Monasteries are scattered around the region.

Climate

Elis has a Mediterranean climate, with hot, sunny summers. Temperatures over 40 °C have been recorded. The mountainous interior is colder, and snow covers the mountains in winter. Elis is more humid than the eastern Peloponnese.

Natural disasters

Elis is located in a seismically active zone, and there are several earthquakes each year. Some of the most significant earthquakes to have hit the area are:
1909: earthquake in Chavari
1910: earthquake in Vartholomio
1920: earthquake in Kyllini
1953: Ionian earthquake, minor damage in Elis
2008: 8 June Peloponnese earthquake, 2 deaths; hundreds of damaged homes and buildings were reported in Lechaina, Amaliada and Vartholomio

Rainy weather in 2002-2003 caused destruction of villages by mudslides, and some bridges and roads were also cut off. In February 2008, frost devastated many crops in Manolada, Nea Manolada and Kounoupeli.

In August 2007, there were enormous forest fires which led to tens of deaths and a massive environmental and economic disaster. The final toll for the prefecture was: 45 dead, 100,000 affected by the fire, 3,500 left homeless by the fire, 25,000 dead animals, 8,500 hectares of burnt forests, 2,300 hectares of burnt farmland. The archaeological site of Olympia was seriously threatened, but not damaged.

Administration

The regional unit Elis is subdivided into 7 municipalities. These are (number as in the map in the infobox):
Ancient Olympia (4)
Andravida-Kyllini (6)
Andritsaina-Krestena (3)
Ilida (2)
Pineios (7)
Pyrgos (1)
Zacharo (5)

2011 reform

As a part of the 2011 Kallikratis government reform, the regional unit Elis was created out of the former prefecture Elis. The prefecture had the same territory as the present regional unit. At the same time, the municipalities were reorganised, according to the table below.

Provinces

Before 2006, Elis was divided into two provinces: Elis Province and Olympia Province. Elis Province contained Hollow or Lowland Elis and the northern part of Pisatis. It was the smallest, but most populous of the two provinces. The seat was Pyrgos. Olympia Province contained most of Pisatis and Triphylia. Its seat was Andritsaina, in the mountains; Krestena and Zacharo were the largest towns in the province.

Population

Elis is the third most populous regional unit of the Peloponnese, after Achaea and Messinia. Between 70% to 75% of the population live on fertile lands away from the mountains.

The population of ancient Elis (from 1000–1 BC) was in the range of 5,000 to 10,000 and reached 10,000 or 20,000 by 1 BC. The population reached 217,000 around 1981, but has been declining since.  Pyrgos became the largest city having the population over the 10,000 mark in the mid-20th century, and above 20,000 in the late 1980s. The population in the northwest is growing while the population is declining in the southeast and east.

Economy

Agriculture
The primary source of agriculture is corn, tomatoes, potatoes, green peppers, livestock, watermelon, melon and some vegetables. There are 3 major operating tomato factories in Savalia (Kyknos), Gastouni (Pelargos), and north of Andravida (Asteris). The most fertile land in Peloponnese is the plain that covers the northern part of Elis and the adjacent part of Achaea.

Textiles used to be dominant in business from antiquity until the Middle Ages. In the 1950s, agriculture was the dominant occupation, except in the towns Amaliada and Pyrgos. Currently, one third of jobs in Elis is in the agricultural sector.

Fishing
Squid, and all types of fish are common in the waters of Elis. Fishing is mainly done in the southeastern Ionian Sea and in the Bay of Patras. Most of the production is sent into Patras, some into Athens, some elsewhere in the world (with small production) and some into the local markets of Elis from Kyllini and Katakolo. Overfishing is a problem north of Lechaina.

History

In classical antiquity, Elis was an independent state, centred on the town Elis and included the sanctuary at Olympia, where the Ancient Olympic Games were held between 776 BC and 394 AD. After 146 BC, Elis was part of the province Achaea within the Roman Empire. In the Migration Period (3rd - 4th century AD) Vandals and Visigoths rampaged through the region. After the final partition of the Roman Empire in 395 Elis was ruled by the Byzantine Empire.

The region of Elis was the Principality's heartland, containing its capital, Andravida, the port town and mint of Glarentza, the fortress of Chlemoutsi, and the extensive Barony of Akova. The Principality lasted from 1204 until 1432, when it was conquered by the Byzantine Despotate of the Morea, which in turn fell in 1460 to the Ottoman Empire.

The Ottoman Empire ruled most of Greece until the Greek War of Independence of 1821. The Venetian Republic controlled a few coastal towns in the 1490s, early 16th century and from 1686 until 1715. Battlegrounds of the Greek War of Independence in Elis include Chlemoutsi, Gastouni, Lala, Lampeia, Pyrgos and Andritsaina.

As a part of independent Greece, Elis experienced an economic and agricultural upswing in the first decades after the war of independence. Houses were built, and Pyrgos became a regional centre. Like most of the Peloponnese, the area was unaffected during World War I. As a result of the Greco-Turkish War (1919–1922), Greek refugees from Asia Minor settled in the area around Amaliada.

World War II struck parts of Elis, houses were damaged, leaving people homeless, and afterwards the Greek Civil War caused more destruction and economic decline. The return to democracy after the Greek military junta of 1967–1974, and Greece joining the European Communities in 1981 stimulated economic development and improvement of infrastructure.

Transport

Roads
Elis has 200 km of highways. There are no limited-access freeways in the prefecture, but a freeway (A9) is being built between Patras and Kyparissia, planned opening 2012.

The principal highways include:
 E55 (GR Highway 9), Patras-Pyrgos–Kyparissia, along the western coast of the Peloponnese
 GR Highway 74, Pyrgos–Lagkadia, Tripoli
 GR Highway 76, Pyrgos–Andritsaina–Megalopolis

Railways

The total length of railway tracks in Elis is around 140 km. There is a railway line from Patras to Kalamata via Pyrgos, and a branch line from Pyrgos to Olympia. Since January 2011, traffic is suspended on the line from Patras to Kalamata, and only the branch line from Pyrgos to Olympia has regular passenger trains.

Ports

The port of Kyllini in the northwest is the busiest port in Elis, with car ferries to the islands of Zakynthos and Kefalonia. The port of Katakolo is an important stop for cruise ships, offering an opportunity for passengers to visit the site of Ancient Olympia. Other ports or harbors are small in size and fit only smaller boats.

Airports

Elis has a military airport near Andravida, north of Pyrgos. There are no public airports in the area. The nearest airport on land is in Kalamata.

Communications
Telephones became more common after the 1960s when the Hellenic Telecommunication Organization (ΟΤΕ) created hundreds of kilometres of phone lines in the region. Now nearly every household has a telephone. The ΟΤΕ built tens of towers to connect more lines for the internet, telephones, and cell phones to increase the service. Lines began around the mid-20th century to enable more people to communicate by phones in the whole of Greece.  There are also several communication towers throughout the prefecture.

ORT (Olympiaki Radiofonia Tileorasi) serves the whole of Elis.  ORT is a Polis affiliate.

There are several local radio stations, for instance RSA (Radio Station of Amalias) from Amalias and Eleftheri Radiofonas Krestenas from Krestena.  There are hundreds of transmitter towers scattered over Elis.

Persons

Panagiotis Adraktas (b. September 28, 1948 in Kardamas), a New Democracy politician
Hristodoulos Aholos or Acholos
Panagiotis Anagnostopoulos, revolutionary leader
Astydameia
Atreus
Dionysia-Theodora Avgerinopoulou among the youngest politicians of the Greek Parliament and UN Award recipient
Avgerinos family:
Agamemnon Avgerinos
Andreas Avgerinos
Charalambos Avgerinos
Dimitrios Avgerinos
Nakis Avgerinos
Petros Avgerinos
Dionyssios N. Bokos, writer of Myrsini, Nihta Pepromenou, etc.
Andreas Bratis, writer of To Vartholomo (The Vartholonio)
Christopoulos family:
Agamemnon Christopoulos, politician, brother of Asimakis
Anastasios Christopoulos, revolutionary leader
Asimakis Christopoulos, politicians, brother of Tzannetos
Charalampos Christopoulos, politician
Christos Christopoulos, father of Anastasios
Tzannetos Christopoulos, politician, son of Anastasios
Christos Daralexis, journalist
Themistoklis Daralexis, politician
Vyronas Davos, a writer, historian and a poet, he published works on Ilia during the Frankish, Ottoman, Venetian periods, the Greek War of Independence and the Modern period
Dionyssis Diakos, revolutionary leader
Ioannis Diakos, revolutionary leader
Takis Doxas, writer
Epeus, ancient mythological legend
Ioannis Giannopoulos, politician
Kostis Gontikas (b. 1934), politician
Dimitrios Gontikas, (1888–1967) a politician and former president of the Greek parliament
Aristeidis Griboutis, journalist
Miltiadis Iatridis, revolutionary leader
Nikos Kahtitsis, writer
Antonios Kalogeropoulos, a revolutionary leader from Myrsini (then Souleimanaga)
Athanassios Kanellopoulos, politician
Simon Karas, music historian
Andreas Karkavitsas
Kostas Kazakos, actor
Dimitrios Kioussopoulos, former Prime Minister of Greece
Dionyssos Kokkinos, writer
Dimitrios Korkolis, politician and mayor of Pyrgos
Krestenitis family:
Aristeidis Krestenitis
Georgios Krestenitis, two politicians
Ioannis Krestenis (elder)
Ioannis Krestenitis (younger), politician
Lykourgos Krestenitis (1793–1873), president of the Greek parliament
Stamatis Krestenitis, a Greek revolutionary leader
Christos Laskaris, poet
Liourdis family:
Ioannis Liourdis, politician
Spyros Liourdis, Greek revolutionary leader
Georgios and Petros Mitzos, revolutionary leaders
Georgios Nikoloutsopoulos, a revolutionary leader from Myrsini (then Souleimanaga)
Alexandros Panagoulis
Georgios Papandreou, an unrelated historian
Theodoros Papasimakopoulos, revolutionary leader
Ioannis Pesmazoglou
Takis Sinopoulos, poet
Sisinis family:
Chrysanthos Sisinis (died 1845), a Greek revolutionary leader and a politician
Georgios Sisinis, a Greek revolutionary leader
Christos Stefanopoulos, politician
Theodoridis family:
Thallis Theodoridis (elder), a Greek revolutionary leader
Thallis Theodoridis (younger), a politician
Vasileios Theodoridis, journalist
Konstantinos Varouxis, journalist, Patris writer
Leonidas Varouxis, journalist, Patris writer
Alexis Vilaetis, a 19th-century politician who was elected in 1868
Charalambos Vilaetis, a Greek revolutionary leader
Lysandros Vilaetis, a chief of Pyrgos and a politician
Nikolaos Vilaetis
Panagis Vourloumis
Panagiotis Kondylis, philosopher, writer and editor
Dimitris Eleas, writer living in London
Panos Karnezis, writer living in London
For the kings of Elis (now Ilia), see section
Pyrrho, father of Skepticism

Sporting teams
Aias - Gastouni
Asteras - Amaliada
Dafni - Andravida
Iliakos - Lechaina
Olympiacos Zacharos - Zacharo
Panileiakos - Pyrgos
PAO Varda - Varda

In popular culture
 The central action of Maeve Binchy's romance novel, Nights of Rain and Stars (2004), is set in Agia Anna, Elis.
 Elis is known within the Greek internet community for the strange or tragicomic news stories that are reported from the region, similar to the "Florida Man" meme.

See also
Elis (constituency)

Notes

References
I Ileia Dia Meson ton Aionon (Ilia In The Middle Of The Age) Georgios Papandreou
Ston Pyrgo kai stin Ileia tou 1821-1930 (Στον Πύργο και στην Ηλεία του 1821-1930 = In Pyrgos And In Ilia (1821–1930)) Vyronas Davos 1996
Ilia Before The Revolution of 1821 (η Ηλεία πρίν την επανάσταση του 1821 = I Ileia prin tin epanastasi tou 1821) Vyronas Davos 1997
The Life Of The Inhabitants Of Ilia During The Turkish Rule (η ζωή των κατοίκων της Ηλείας κατα την τουρκοκρατία = I zoi ton katoikon tis Ileias kata ton tourkokratia) Vyronas Davos 1997
Toponmia tis Ileias (Τοπονύμια της Ηλείας = Toponym of Elis) Vyronas Davos

External links

Amaliada City Web Portal- Η Διαδικτυακή Πύλη της Αμαλιάδας (I Diadiktyaki Pyli tis Amaliadas) - www.amaliada.net
The Prefectural administration of Ilia (in Greek)
Geography of Ilia (in Greek)
Structurae: Structural engineering and architecture Guide to Ilia Prefecture

 
Prefectures of Greece
1899 establishments in Greece
Regional units of Western Greece
Peloponnese